Casagiove is a comune (municipality) in the Province of Caserta in the Italian region Campania, located about  west of Caserta.

History
It was built in an area previously colonized by the ancient Greeks. In fact its name means "Jupiter's house", due to its ancient temple dedicated to this divinity. The Appian Way, the Roman road which linked Rome to southern Italy, passed by here. On Casagiove's hill Hannibal, before his failed attempt to invade Rome, stopped for some weeks.

Casagiove housed numerous people who were working for the construction of the Royal Palace of Caserta. Later it became a military quarter. Until the mid-19th century it was divided in two parts: Casanova and Coccagna.

The architect Luigi Vanvitelli is buried in the church of San Francesco di Paola.

References

Cities and towns in Campania